Senator Price may refer to:

Bob Price (Texas politician) (1927–2004), Texas State Senate
Curren Price (born 1950), California State Senate
Ed Price (Florida politician) (1918–2012), Florida State Senate
Ed Price (Louisiana politician) (born 1953), Louisiana State Senate
Eli Kirk Price (1797–1884), Pennsylvania State Senate
George E. Price (1848–1938), West Virginia State Senate
Hugh H. Price (1859–1904), Wisconsin State Senate
Jesse Price (1863–1939), Maryland State Senate
Leonard Price (born 1942), Minnesota State Senate
Marian Heiss Price (born 1938), Nebraska State Senate
Phillip Price Jr. (born 1934), Pennsylvania State Senate
Randy Price (born 1957), Alabama State Senate
Samuel Price (1805–1884), U.S. Senator from West Virginia from 1876 to 1877
Scott Price (Nebraska politician) (born 1962), Nebraska State Senate
Tom Price (American politician) (born 1954), Georgia State Senate
William T. Price (1824–1886), Wisconsin State Senate